Kenyon Green (born March 15, 2001) is an American football guard for the Houston Texans of the National Football League (NFL). He played college football at Texas A&M, where he was a two-time consensus All-American. Green was drafted by the Texans in the first round of the 2022 NFL Draft.

Early life and high school
Green grew up in Humble, Texas and attended Atascocita High School. Green was rated a five-star recruit and originally committed to play college football at LSU during his sophomore year before decommitting as a junior and choosing to enroll at Texas A&M.

College career
Green was named Texas A&M's starting right guard going into his freshman season. He started all 13 of the team's games and was named to the Southeastern Conference All-Freshman Team. As a sophomore, Green moved to left guard and started all nine of the Aggies games and was named a first-team All-American by Sporting News and the Football Writers Association of America and was a second-team selection by the Associated Press, the American Football Coaches Association, and the Walter Camp Foundation, tying him with BYU's Brady Christensen for a consensus All-American selection. He moved to offensive tackle for the 2021 season.

As a junior, Green received first-team All-America honors from Sporting News, the Associated Press,  CBS Sports, and USA Today. He was named a second-team All-American by the Walter Camp Football Foundation, The Athletic, the American Football Coaches Association, and the Football Writers Association of America. He was also a finalist for the Lombardi Award, which was ultimately awarded to Michigan's Aidan Hutchinson.

Green decided to forgo his final year of eligibility to enter the 2022 NFL Draft.

Professional career

Houston Texans
Green was selected with the 15th overall pick by the Houston Texans in the 2022 NFL Draft.

References

External links 
 Houston Texans bio
 Texas A&M Aggies bio

2001 births
Living people
People from Humble, Texas
Sportspeople from Harris County, Texas
Players of American football from Texas
African-American players of American football
American football offensive guards
American football offensive tackles
Texas A&M Aggies football players
All-American college football players
21st-century African-American sportspeople
Houston Texans players